The Secchia (called by Pliny ) is an Italian river. One of the main right bank tributaries of the Po, it flows through the Emilia-Romagna region in northern Italy.

Here it touches on the city of Modena and, with its riverbank protected by embankments, runs into the Po just south of Mantua, close to the mouth of the Mincio.

Notes

Rivers of Italy
Rivers of the Province of Modena
Rivers of the Province of Reggio Emilia
Rivers of the Province of Mantua
Rivers of the Apennines